Guillaume Bodinier (1795–1872), a French historical and portrait painter, was born in Angers. He studied in Rome under the direction of Pierre Guérin, and exhibited at the Salon from 1827 to 1857. After a long residence in Rome he returned to his native city, where he became director of the Museum, and died in 1872. His best work is the 'Angelus in the Gampagna of Rome,' painted in 1836, and formerly in the collection of the Duke of Orléans.

References

External links 

19th-century French painters
French male painters
1795 births
1872 deaths
People from Angers
19th-century French male artists
18th-century French male artists